The 2021–22 Elon Phoenix men's basketball team represented Elon University in the 2021–22 NCAA Division I men's basketball season. The Phoenix, led by third-year head coach Mike Schrage, played their home games at the Schar Center in Elon, North Carolina as members of the Colonial Athletic Association. They finished the season 10–22, 7–11 in CAA play to finish in seventh place. They lost in the quarterfinals of the CAA tournament to UNC Wilmington.

Previous season
In a season limited due to the ongoing COVID-19 pandemic, the Phoenix finished the 2020–21 season 10–9, 4–7 in CAA play to finish in eighth place. In the CAA tournament, they defeated Towson, top-seeded James Madison, and Hofstra to advance to the tournament championship game for the first time in program history. There they lost to Drexel.

Roster

Schedule and results

|-
!colspan=12 style=| Non-conference regular season

|-
!colspan=9 style=| CAA regular season

|-
!colspan=12 style=| CAA tournament

Source

References

Elon Phoenix men's basketball seasons
Elon Phoenix
Elon Phoenix men's basketball
Elon Phoenix men's basketball